Ormož (in older sources , , , Prekmurje Slovene: Ormošd) is a town in the traditional region of Prlekija, part of Styria, in northeastern Slovenia. It lies on the left bank of the Drava River and borders with Croatia on the opposite bank of the river. It is the administrative seat of the Municipality of Ormož.

Name
Ormož was attested in written records in 1273 as Holermůs (and as Holrmues in 1299 and Holrmůs in 1320). The name is based on the Latinized name Alramus, borrowed from Germanic Alram (< *Aþala-hraban, literally 'noble ravan'). The person designated by the name is uncertain, but a possible namesake is Salzburg Bishop A(da)lram (reigned 821–836) because the Ormož area became the property of the Archbishopric of Salzburg in the ninth century.

History
The settlement received market rights in 1293 and town rights in 1331, and it was predominantly know under its German name, Friedau. Until 1919, the population was predominantly German; the census of 1900 mentioned 892 inhabitants, with German as the predominant spoken language (593) followed by Slovenian (227).

Church
The parish church in the town is dedicated to Saint James. It was first mentioned in written sources dated to 1271. It was rebuilt on a number of occasions in the 16th, 17th, and 18th centuries. It contains frescos from the 14th and 17th centuries.

Notable natives and residents
 Ivan Geršak (1838–1911), notary public, president of several local societies, national awakener, politician, writer, and advocate of Slovene
  (1905–1975), writer, journalist, editor, clerical political activist
  (1790–1844), historian, writer, poet
 Antun Vramec (1538–1587/8), historian, writer
 Countess Maria Irma Wurmbrand-Georgievich (1886–1970), last owner of Ormož Castle
 Baron Guido Georgievich
 Marko Bezjak, handball player

See also
Illyrian amber figures

References

External links
 
 Ormož on Geopedia

Populated places in the Municipality of Ormož
Cities and towns in Styria (Slovenia)